Irish church may refer to:

Roman Catholic Church in Ireland
Church of Ireland
Presbyterian Church in Ireland

See also
 Christianity in Ireland
 British church (disambiguation)